The Americas Zone is one of three zones of regional competition in the 2007 Davis Cup.

Group I

Group II

Jamaica and Cuba relegated to Group III in 2008.
Uruguay promoted to Group I in 2008.

Group III
Venue: Federación Nacional de Tenis de Guatemala, Guatemala City, Guatemala (hard)
Date: 20–24 June

Top two teams advance to 1st–4th Play-off, bottom two teams advance to 5th–8th Play-off. Scores in italics carried over from pools.

Bahamas and Bolivia promoted to Group II in 2008.
Haiti and Costa Rica relegated to Group IV in 2008.

Group IV
Venue: Federación Nacional de Tenis de Guatemala, Guatemala City, Guatemala (hard)
Date: 20–24 June
Withdrawn: Bermuda, Eastern Caribbean, Saint Lucia

Aruba and Honduras promoted to Group III in 2008.

See also
Davis Cup structure

 
Americas
Davis Cup Americas Zone